The MURUGAN Temple in a Murugan temple located at Ettukkudi in Nagapattinam district in Tamil Nadu, India.

Location
The temple is located in Tiruvarur-Vedaranyam route at a distance of 25 km from Tiruvarur. This temple can be reached at a distance of 2 km. from Seeravattam palam in Nagapattinam-Thiruthuraipoondi road.

Shrines
The shrines of Ganapathi, Juradeva, Srinivasa Soundiraraja Perumal, Anjaneya, Manonmani, Ayyappan, Mahalakshmi. Navagrahas, Shani and Bhairava. A Siddha known as Vanmeeka attained samathi here. In the sanctum sanctorum Muruga is found, flanked by Valli and Deivanai, sitting on a peacock. The base for the sculpture is the two legs of the peacock.  In the right side of Muruga shrine, the shrine of Soundhiresvarar and in the left the shrine of the goddess Anandavalli Amman is found. In front of the temple, the temple tank is found.

Festivals
Observing the Sashti Vradha and Gowri Vradha simultaneously is considered auspicious in this temple. Chitra Pournami (festival), Kandha Sashti, festivals throughout the Tamil month of Vaikasi and special pujas in the Tamil month of Karthikai are celebrated in this temple.

Worshipping time
This temple is open for worship from 4.30 a.m. to 12.00 noon and from 4.30 p.m. to 8.30 p.m.

Reference

External links
 800 ஆண்டுகள் பழமை வாய்ந்த எட்டுக்கு முருகன், கோபுர தரிசனம், எட்டுக்குடி, 19 ஆகஸ்டு 2020 
 அருள்மிகு சுப்பிரமணிய சுவாமி திருக்கோவில், எட்டுக்குடி - 610 212, இணையதளம்

Photogallery 

Murugan temples in Tamil Nadu
Hindu temples in Tamil Nadu
Kaumaram